Jinshahu may refer to:

 Jinshahu Station, Hangzhou Metro, Zhejiang Province, China
 Jinshahu National Wetland Park, Hubei Province, China